A bedtime story is a traditional form of storytelling, where a  story is told to a child at bedtime to prepare the child for sleep. The bedtime story has long been considered "a definite institution in many families".

The term "bedtime story" was coined by Louise Chandler Moulton in her 1873 book, Bed-time Stories.  The scholar Robin Bernstein traces how the "ritual of an adult reading out loud to a child at bedtime formed mainly in the second half of the nineteenth century and achieved prominence in the early twentieth century in tandem with the rising belief that soothing rituals were necessary for children at the end of the day. The ritual resulted from and negotiated diverse phenomena: not only the growth of the picture book industry but also the spread of isolated sleeping in which children occupied individual bedrooms, the expansion of electricity and heating systems that shifted evening reading beyond the hearth to other domestic spaces, and a bevy of newly crowned psychological experts who persuaded parents that children needed" bedtime rituals. "By the middle of the twentieth
century," Bernstein writes, "the ritual had acquired acute symbolic meaning. Parents’ reading to children at bedtime became a metonym for proper parenting and an idealized middle- class childhood."

Reading bedtime stories yields multiple benefits for parents and children alike. The fixed routine of a bedtime story before sleeping can improve the child's brain development, language mastery, and logical thinking skills. The storyteller-listener relationship creates an emotional bond between the parent and the child. Due to "the strength of the imitative instinct" of a child, the parent and the stories that they tell act as a model for the child to follow.

Bedtime stories are also useful for teaching the child abstract virtues such as sympathy, selflessness, and self-control, as most children are said to be "naturally sympathetic when they have experienced or can imagine the feelings of others". Thus, bedtime stories can be used to discuss darker subjects such as death and racism. As the bedtime stories broaden in theme, the child "will broaden in their conception of the lives and feelings of others".

Adult versions in the form of audio books help adults fall asleep without finishing the story.

Western culture

Within the Western culture, many parents read bedtime stories to their kids for assuring peaceful sleep. Usually, this habit is considered as a way to build good relationship between parents and the kids along with the generation of other benefits. The type of stories and the timing may differ on cultural basis. In western culture, you may find different categories of bedtime stories.

Cultural depiction 

Like any other culture, western bedtime stories are full of the traditional value and stories from the predominant sub-cultures. Mentioning of cowboys and hippie lifestyle is a prominent form of verbal storytelling.

New authors 
 
With the ease of publishing and color printing, new authors have become part of the story writing industry where they write new, creative and picture-related stories to keep the audience engaged as presented in a series of children's storybooks written by Arthur S. Maxwell.

European culture 

The European culture has a vast collection of bedtime stories. They are not only read in the European region, but they are famous throughout the world. This helps the kids to develop their minds and enhance their capability. The European culture of bedtime stories is based on Aesop's or Greek fables which are loved all around the world by both the adults and children.

Aesop's fables 

The Aesop's fables are a collection of fables that were written by a Greek storyteller named Aesop. These fables include different animal characters, providing a moral lesson or a great place of wisdom for the young minds to understand. As these fables include morals, they are read to children in modern times to teach them ethical and moral values.

The Aesop's Fables originally belong to the oral tradition and Greek people. After thirty years of Aesop's death, these fables were collected and  compiled. The work of the Aesop was in Latin and Greek which was later translated to different languages, giving more fame to theses fables.

Different Aesop's fables 

There is a vast collection of Aesop's fables for children to read at bedtime. A lot of them are very famous and very much loved by the children as well as the parents. Some of the many Aesop's Fables are:

 The Ant and the Grasshopper
 The Boy Who Cried Wolf
 The Cock, the Dog and the Fox
 The Dog and Its Reflection

What's there in Aesop's fables 

The fables help the kids as well as adult to learn the lessons fast in an effective manner. The examples are more powerful than percept. Therefore, the children gain more ethical values from these types of stories.

Contemporary bedtime stories 

In the modern age many adults use bedtime stories to fall asleep. The app Calm is used by many for this purpose.

Scientific research 
Being read bedtime stories increases children's vocabularies.

References

External links

Folklore
Performing arts
Sleep
Children's literature
Childhood